GQ Thailand is the Thai edition of the international monthly men's magazine GQ. It was launched in September 2014. The first issue had a triple fold-out cover, with pictures of eight well-known Thai men.

References

GQ (magazine)
2014 establishments in Thailand
Men's fashion magazines
Magazines established in 2014
Monthly magazines
Magazines published in Thailand